This article lists film and television works which feature or discuss the environment, environmentalism or environmental issues.

Some notable and commercially successful films have featured environmental themes and are commemorated through several environmental film festivals held annually. The Annual Environmental Media Awards have been presented by the Environmental Media Association (EMA) since 1991 to the best television episode or film with an environmental message.

List of documentary films about the environment
This is a list of documentary films related to the environment.

List of fictional films about the environment
Some fictional films are based on true events.

Television

See also
 Timeline of history of environmentalism
 Green Film Network
 green.tv, a website dedicated to showing environmental films clips
 DC Environmental Film Festival
 Eco-terrorism in fiction
 List of eco-horror films
 Environmentalism in The Lord of the Rings
 List of films about nuclear issues
 National Film Award for Best Non-Feature Environment/Conservation/Preservation Film

References

External links
 Green Planet Stream: Nature, Environment and Human Ecology films
 Natural Heroes: Public Television series
 Green.tv
 Films on Environment Problems

 
 
 
environmental
environmentalism